Andreas Luckermans (born 9 July 1992) is a Belgian footballer who plays for SC Aarschot. He formerly played on loan for Dutch sides FC Dordrecht and Helmond Sport.

References

External links
 Voetbal International profile 

Andreas Luckermans at Footballdatabase

1992 births
Living people
Belgian footballers
Belgian expatriate footballers
Association football midfielders
R.S.C. Anderlecht players
FC Dordrecht players
Helmond Sport players
K.S.K. Heist players
K.R.C. Mechelen players
Challenger Pro League players
Eerste Divisie players
Footballers from Flemish Brabant
Belgian expatriate sportspeople in the Netherlands
Expatriate footballers in the Netherlands
Sportspeople from Leuven